Masatepe Masatepe is one of the nine municipalities of the Department of Masaya in Nicaragua. It is located on the plateau of the villages 50 kilometers from Managua along the road to Masaya. It belongs to the tourist corridor of " Los Pueblos Blancos" on top of the coffee-producing Volcanic Plateau. The origin of the word "Masatepe" comes from Nahuatl Mazatl-tepec, «populated deer» or mazatl-tepetl, 'Deer Mountain'.

History 

The name Mazatepetl, meaning in Nahuatl: "Deer Mountain". The population of Chorotega origin, settled in the foothills of the Masaya Volcano, it is important to emphasize that in research deeper envelope the Aboriginal time appears the name Mazatepetl, but Matapalete or Popocatepetl than in Nahuatl means: "Burning Hill".

The ancestors settled from the Laguna de Masaya to the Pochote in the margins of the Masaya Volcano, then was moved to Nimboja and Jalapa.

According to Chronicles of the colony, 1 September 1528 to 5 May 1529, Fray Francisco de Bobadilla visited Matapalete and named a total of 154 aborigines living in the place. In an article of the year, 1613 historian Fray Juan Torquemada appears registered as municipality Masatepe.

In 1835 during the modern era and when Nicaragua had only four departments, Masatepe belonged to Granada.

Weather and Location 
Masatepe is located on top of the Plateau of towns, at an altitude of 475m, the total area can be divided into two main different types of biomes:

1- Rain forest (Usually has native trees and Coffee Plantations. Elv: (400 - 500m)

2- Dry Valley. ( can be found near the coast of the Lagoon, and the Masaya Volcano ). Elv: (90 - 250m)

The temperature fluctuates during the year, being mostly warm. During the winter months (November - January) the temperatures become cooler, and there are usually foggy mornings.

Sports
The town is home of football club Deportivo Masatepe.

External links
Alcaldía Municipal de Masatepe Official Web Site of Masatepe (Spanish)
Masatepe.org In the internet since 2001. General Information about the city, photos, videos and much more about this city, including a virtual tour (Spanish)
MasatepeCity.com Information and videos of Masatepe (Spanish)
 Web site of the Partnerschaftsverein Kreis Gross-Gerau - Masatepe (German, Spanish)

References 

Populated places in Nicaragua
Municipalities of the Masaya Department